Jos Jacobs (born 28 January 1953 in Vosselaar) is a Belgian former professional road bicycle racer.

Major results

1973
Petegem-aan-de-Leie
1974
Heist-op-den-Berg
Omloop der Grensstreek
Grote 1-Mei Prijs
Noorderwijk
1975
Omloop van Midden-Brabant
Schaal Sels-Merksem
Grote 1-Mei Prijs
Noorderwijk
Kalmthout
Oud-Turnhout
1976
Brussel/Berchem - Ingooigem
Deerlijk
Nandrin
Polder-Kempen
Grote 1-Mei Prijs
Oostkamp
Zomergem
Diest
Oud-Turnhout
Onze-Lieve-Vrouw Waver
1977
GP Pino Cerami
Lede
Omloop der drie Proviniciën
GP de Peymeinade
1978
Nationale Sluitingsprijs
Omloop Hageland-Zuiderkempen
Diest
Willebroek
1979
Schaal Sels-Merksem
Lutlommel
Rummen
Tour de France:
Winner stage 6
1980
 Belgian National Road Race Championships
Peer
Herselt
Retie
1981
Kuurne–Brussels–Kuurne
Rund um den Henninger-Turm
Vosselaar
1982
GP Fina
Le Samyn
1983
Stekene
Burcht
1984
Flèche Hesbignonne Cras Avernas

External links 

Official Tour de France results for Jos Jacobs

Belgian male cyclists
1953 births
Living people
Belgian Tour de France stage winners
Cyclists from Antwerp Province
People from Vosselaar
Tour de Suisse stage winners
20th-century Belgian people